Rear-Admiral Charles Bernard Williams  (19 February 1925 – 11 June 2015) was an officer of the Royal Navy. He was chairman of the Whitbread Round the World Race from 1981 to 1990.

Williams was born in Grahamstown, South Africa, in 1925. He joined the Royal Navy soon after the start of the Second World War and became an engineering officer. He worked on ships of the Russian convoys and those providing gun fire support during the Normandy landings.

He was appointed OBE for his work at the shore base HMS Sheba repairing British ships involved in the blockade of Beira. He was made CB on his retirement in 1980 by which time he was Flag Officer, Medway and Port Admiral at Chatham Naval Base.

Williams was involved with the restoration of the Dutch lugger STV Astrid with the financial support of Sir Jack Hayward.

References 

1925 births
2015 deaths
Officers of the Order of the British Empire
People from Makhanda, Eastern Cape
Companions of the Order of the Bath
Royal Navy officers of World War II
Royal Navy admirals